Mirren is a surname. Notable people with the surname include:

Helen Mirren (born 1945), English actor
Simon Mirren, British television writer and producer, nephew of Helen

See also
Merren
St Mirren (disambiguation)